Caladenia hirta subsp. hirta, commonly known as the sugar candy orchid or candy orchid, is a plant in the orchid family Orchidaceae and is endemic to the south-west of Western Australia. It has a single leaf and up to three creamy-white or pink flowers with brownish tips and a brown back.

Description
Caladenia hirta subsp. hirta is a terrestrial, perennial, deciduous, herb with an underground tuber and which usually occurs as single plants. The flowers are creamy-white to pink on the front with brownish tips and a brown back. The lateral sepals and petals spread slightly upwards, then arch downwards. Flowering occurs from late August to early November and there are more flowers after summer fires.

Taxonomy and naming
Caladenia hirta was first formally described by John Lindley in 1840 and the description was published in A Sketch of the Vegetation of the Swan River Colony but in 2001 Stephen Hopper and Andrew Brown described two subspecies, including subspecies hirta and the description of the two subspecies was published in Nuytsia. The specific epithet (hirta) is a Latin word meaning “hairy” or "rough" referring to the thick hairs on most parts of this orchid.

Distribution and habitat
The sugar candy orchid occurs between Arrowsmith and Albany in the Avon Wheatbelt, Esperance Plains, Geraldton Sandplains, Jarrah Forest, Swan Coastal Plain and Warren biogeographic regions. It grows in woodland and forest areas that are swampy in winter.

Conservation
Caladenia hirta subsp. hirta  is classified as "not threatened" by the Western Australian Government Department of Parks and Wildlife.

References

hirta subsp. hirta
Endemic orchids of Australia
Orchids of South Australia
Orchids of Western Australia
Plants described in 1840
Taxa named by Stephen Hopper